Erich Mußfeldt also spelled Erich Muhsfeldt (18 February 1913 – 24 January 1948) was a German war criminal.

He served as an SS NCO in three extermination camps during World War II in German occupied Poland and Germany: Auschwitz, Majdanek and Flossenbürg. After the war, he was tried for war crimes by the U.S. military, found guilty of committing atrocities in Flossenbürg concentration camp, and sentenced to life in prison. However, Muhsfeldt was then extradited to Poland, where the full extent of his war crimes was revealed due to new evidence. He was retried by the Supreme National Tribunal at the Auschwitz Trial in Kraków, and found guilty of crimes against humanity. Muhsfeldt was sentenced to death by hanging in December 1947, and executed on 24 January 1948.

Pre-war and personal life

Erich Muhsfeldt was born on 18 February 1913 in Berkenbrück, Brandenburg, Germany.  His father worked as a labourer at the State Water Administration in Fürstenwalde. In 1927, Muhsfeldt completed 8 classes of elementary school, and three years later he gained the profession of a baker, in which he worked for 2 years as a journeyman.

At the time of his service in the SS-Totenkopfverbände he was reportedly married with two children. The fate of his wife is unclear. According to Miklós Nyiszli, his wife was killed in an air raid, and his son sent to the Russian front.

SS-career
Originally Muhsfeldt served with the German SS-Sonderkommando at Auschwitz I in 1940. He was transferred to the work/extermination camp at Majdanek on 15 November 1941. He was present at the final mass shooting of the camp's remaining Jewish inmates known as the Operation Harvest Festival or "Erntefest, the largest single-day, single-camp massacre of the Holocaust, totalling 43,000 in three nearby locations.

Muhsfeldt testified of the incident before the Polish Court in Kraków in 1947:
When the Majdanek camp was liquidated, Muhsfeldt was transferred back to Auschwitz, where he then served as supervising SS officer of the Jewish Sonderkommando in Crematorium II and III in Auschwitz II (Birkenau).

Upon his return to Auschwitz, Muhsfeldt had an unusual relationship with renowned Jewish-Hungarian pathologist Miklós Nyiszli, who was forced to carry out autopsies on behalf of Josef Mengele. According to Nyiszli, “[Muhsfeldt] often came to see me in the dissecting room, and we conversed on politics, the military situation and various other subjects.” Nyiszli survived the war and later gave evidence about what happened at Auschwitz. Nyiszli described one incident when Muhsfeldt came to him for a routine check-up, after shooting 80 prisoners in the back of the head prior to their cremation: 

Nyiszli described an exceedingly rare occurrence, in which an inmate girl of 16, due to highly unusual circumstances, managed to survive the gas chamber and, with medical help from Nyiszli and others after she was discovered alive, was partially recovering. Nyiszli took up her case with Muhsfeldt asking that her life be spared: “These were my arguments, and I asked him to do something for the child. He listened to me attentively, then asked me exactly what I proposed doing. I saw by his expression that I had put him face to face with a practically impossible problem.”

Muhsfeldt replied, "There's no way of getting round it, the child will have to die." Nyiszli explains that "Half an hour later the young girl was led, or rather carried, into the furnace room hallway, and there [Muhsfeldt] sent another in his place to do the job. A bullet in the back of the neck..."

Trial
After the war had ended, Muhsfeldt was arrested by U.S. military officials. He was tried for committing atrocities in Flossenbürg concentration camp by an American military court. Witnesses said they saw Muhsfeldt beat and shoot multiple prisoners. In January 1947, Muhsfeldt was found guilty and given a life sentence. However, he was then extradited to Poland where he was retried in Kraków by the Supreme National Tribunal in November 1947 for crimes committed in Auschwitz. In December 1947, Muhsfeldt was found guilty of crimes against humanity and sentenced to death. He was executed in 1948.

In popular culture
Muhsfeldt appears as a minor character in the 1983 James Michener novel Poland, and is portrayed by Harvey Keitel in the 2001 film The Grey Zone.

Notes

1913 births
1948 deaths
Auschwitz concentration camp personnel
Auschwitz trial executions
Flossenbürg concentration camp personnel
Majdanek concentration camp personnel
SS non-commissioned officers
Executed people from Brandenburg
People convicted in the Dachau trials
German people convicted of crimes against humanity
Prisoners sentenced to life imprisonment by the United States military
Waffen-SS personnel
Holocaust perpetrators in Poland
People extradited to Poland
Executed mass murderers